Jashore Cantonment is a cantonment located in the southern part of Bangladesh in Jashore District outside Jashore town and the HQ of 55th Infantry Division.

Installations
Brishreshtho Matiur Rahman Air Force Base
55th Infantry Division
8 Engineering Battalion
1 Signal Battalion 
55th Artillery Brigade
105th Infantry Brigade 
88th Infantry Brigade 
21st Infantry Brigade 
Station Headquarters, Jashore Cantonment
Area Headquarters, Jashore Area
Ordnance Depot, Jashore Cantonment 
Garrison Engineer (Army), Jashore 
Signals Training Centre And School (STCS)
Military Engineering Service(MES)

Education
Jashore Cantonment College
Jashore Cantonment High School
Army Medical College, Jashore (AMCJ)
 BAF Shaheen College, Jessore

References

Cantonments of Bangladesh